Podolobium ilicifolium, commonly known as prickly shaggy-pea, is a flowering plant in the family Fabaceae and grows in eastern and southern Australia. The inflorescence is a cluster of yellow or orange pea-like flowers with red markings and shiny green, prickly foliage.

Description

Taxonomy and naming
Podolobium ilicifolium was first formally described in 1995 by Michael Crisp & P.H.Weston and the description was published in Advances in Legume Systematics. The specific epithet (ilicifolium) means "holly leaved ".

Distribution and habitat
Prickly shaggy-pea is a common plant, found in dry or moist sclerophyll forest, often on clay or sandstone based soils in New South Wales, Queensland and Victoria.

References

Fabales of Australia
Flora of New South Wales
Flora of Queensland
Flora of Victoria (Australia)
ilicifolium
Taxa named by Henry Cranke Andrews